The California Route 66 Museum is located on Historic U.S. Route 66 in Old Town Victorville, in the Mojave Desert within San Bernardino County, California.

Constantly changing exhibitions follow the development of U.S. Route 66 from the time of early pioneer trails and railroads. Historic photographs and artifacts explore the impact of the highway upon the local economy and culture.

Three display rooms and a gift shop are housed in the  former Red Rooster Cafe.

History
The museum was founded by Old Town Victorville Heritage Preservation, Inc. It opened its doors on November 11, 1995. It is supported by contributions from volunteers, donors and patrons.

Filming location
The museum's building, when it was still operating as the Red Rooster Cafe, was the location for the Neil Diamond film The Jazz Singer.

See also

List of Route 66 museums

References

External links
Official California Route 66 Museum website
California Historic Route 66 Association website

Museums in San Bernardino County, California
U.S. Route 66 in California
Victorville, California
Automobile museums in California
History museums in California
History of the Mojave Desert region
Tourist attractions along U.S. Route 66
Museums established in 1995
1995 establishments in California